Julia Wahlberg (born 29 September 1995) is a Swedish footballer who last played for Kopparbergs/Göteborg FC in the fully professional Damallsvenskan, the highest Swedish women's league, as a midfielder. Wahlberg played for Jitex BK in 2013. She has also played for the Swedish U17 and U19 teams.

References

External links
 
 
  
 

1995 births
Swedish women's footballers
Living people
BK Häcken FF players
Jitex BK players
Damallsvenskan players
Women's association football midfielders
Kungsbacka DFF players